Taken Away is a 1989 American made-for-television film starring Valerie Bertinelli, Kevin Dunn, Anna Maria Horsford and Juliet Sorci. The film was directed by John Patterson and premiered on CBS on November 5, 1989.

Synopsis 
Stephanie Monroe (Valerie Bertinelli) is a single mother raising her eight year old daughter, Abby Monroe (Juliet Sorci). On one night, Stephanie has to go to school and Abby begs her mother to stay at home alone, rather than going to a babysitter's house. When Abby falls down, she gets scared and calls the police, thinking that they will bring her to her mother. The police arrives and instead places Abby in protective custody of the court. Stephanie must fight with the state to get her daughter back.

Cast 

 Valerie Bertinelli as Stephanie Monroe
 Juliet Sorci as Abby Monroe
 Kevin Dunn as Mr. Lombardi
 Anna Maria Horsford as Marion Pierson
 Matthew Faison as Judge
 Nada Despotovich as Brenda
 Susannah Blinkoff as Fairfax Admissions Worker
 April Ortiz as Intake Worker

Production 
Valerie Bertinelli turned down her role for the film several times before accepting it.

References 

CBS network films
1989 television films
1989 films
Films directed by John Patterson